Hyponephele lycaon, the dusky meadow brown, is a butterfly species belonging to the family Nymphalidae. It is broadly distributed in the temperate zone of the Palearctic from Portugal in the west to the Russian Far East in the east.

The wingspan is about 40 mm. The butterflies fly from June to August depending on the location.

The larvae feed on various grasses.

References

Butterflies of Europe: Hyponephele lycaon

lycaon
Butterflies of Asia
Butterflies of Europe
Insects of Russia
Butterflies described in 1775
Taxa named by S. A. von Rottemburg